Liefdesintriges is a 1920 Dutch silent film. It was produced by Nationale Filmfabriek Bloemendaal. It features two men attempting to woo a woman and one getting jealous and punching the other man.

References

External links

Dutch silent short films
1920 films
Dutch black-and-white films